Glow is the third album by the American folk rock band the Innocence Mission, released in 1995 on A&M Records. Musically, it marks a radical departure for the group, as the Sundays/10,000 Maniacs-inspired dream pop aesthetic found on their first two albums was replaced by a more straightforward, cleaner rock sound. The album was recorded over a several-month period at Kingsway Studios, New Orleans, Louisiana and Bad Animals Studios, Seattle, Washington.

Track listing
 "Keeping Awake" – 3:58
 "Bright As Yellow" – 3:32
 "Brave" – 3:49
 "That Was Another Country" – 4:18
 "Speak Our Minds" – 2:54
 "Happy, The End" – 3:38
 "Our Harry" – 2:21
 "Go" – 3:06
 "Everything's Different Now" – 3:16
 "Spinning" – 3:13
 "There" – 3:55
 "I Hear You Say So" – 2:11

All songs written by Karen Peris except "Keeping Awake", music by Don and Karen Peris.

"Bright As Yellow"
"Bright As Yellow", the album's only official single, peaked at number 33 on Billboard's Modern Rock Tracks chart. It was featured extensively on several episodes of the hit TV series Party of Five and can also be found on the soundtrack to the film Empire Records, among others.

On June 6, 2008, "Bright as Yellow" was played as the official NASA wake-up call for the crew of Space Shuttle mission STS-124 on flight day 7.

The track list for the single is as follows:
 "Bright As Yellow" (Album Version) – 3:33
 "Let's Talk About Something Else" – 3:15
 "That Was Another Country" (Album Version) – 4:17
 "Geranium Lake" – 1:27

All songs written by Karen Peris except "Let's Talk About Something Else" and "Geranium Lake", written by Karen Peris and Don Peris. All songs produced by Dennis Herring except two and four, recorded and engineered by Don Peris.

Personnel
 Karen Peris – vocals, piano, acoustic guitar, organ
 Don Peris – guitars, organ
 Mike Bitts – bass guitar, vocals, vibes
 Steve Brown – drums, tambourine
 David Tonkonogui – cello on "That Was Another Country"
 Dennis Herring – producer
 Bob Ludwig – mastering
 Chris Fuhrman – engineer
 John Burton – assistant engineer
 Trina Shoemaker – assistant engineer

References 

The Innocence Mission albums
1995 albums
A&M Records albums
Albums produced by Dennis Herring